RDH may refer to:

 Redhill MRT station, Singapore (MRT station abbreviation)
 Registered Dental Hygienist
 Retinol dehydrogenase, an enzyme
 Royal Darwin Hospital, Northern Territory, Australia
 Reference datum height, an aviation metric
 Radiotron Designer's Handbook, a famous book by Wireless Press